Edward Peter Bertram Savile Foljambe, 5th Earl of Liverpool (born 14 November 1944), is an English Conservative politician and businessman.

Early life
Liverpool is the posthumous son of Captain Peter George William Savile Foljambe (1919–1944), who was killed in World War II in September 1944, and the former Elizabeth Joan Flint. His paternal grandfather was the Hon. Bertram Foljambe, sixth son of Cecil Foljambe, 1st Earl of Liverpool, the former Lord Steward of the Household to Edward VII.

Foljambe was educated at Shrewsbury School and the University of Perugia.

Career
In 1969, at the age of 24, he succeeded his great-uncle as Earl of Liverpool and took his seat in the House of Lords. He was one of the 90+ elected hereditary peers who remain in the House of Lords after the House of Lords Act of 1999, and sits on the Conservative benches.

He is a former managing director of Melbourns Brewery and director of hotel management company Hart Hambleton.

Personal life
Lord Liverpool married three times: firstly, Lady Juliana Mary Alice Noel, daughter of Anthony Noel, 5th Earl of Gainsborough, and Mary Stourton, on 29 January 1970. Before they were divorced in 1994, they had two children:

 Luke Foljambe, Viscount Hawkesbury (b. 25 March 1972) 
 Hon. Ralph Foljambe (b. 1974)

He married, secondly, Countess Marie-Ange Michel de Pierredon, daughter of Count Géraud Michel de Pierredon, on 26 May 1995. They were divorced in 2001. He married, thirdly, Georgina Ann Lederman (née Rubin) in 2002.

Arms

Notes

References

External links

 

1944 births
Living people
Edward
Conservative Party (UK) hereditary peers
People educated at Shrewsbury School

Hereditary peers elected under the House of Lords Act 1999